Demolition is the first studio album by the British heavy metal band, Girlschool. It was released in Europe on Bronze Records in 1980.

It was produced by experienced sound engineer Vic Maile. Demolition reached No. 28 in the UK Albums Chart, following the rising of the new wave of British heavy metal phenomenon.
The tour supporting the album included high-profile support slots to Black Sabbath and Uriah Heep shows.

"Race with the Devil" is a cover of the song originally performed by the British rock band The Gun.

The 2004 CD edition issued by Castle, a subsidiary of Sanctuary Records, contains bonus tracks and extensive sleevenotes by Record Collector'''s Joe Geesin.

 Track listings

Tracks 16–19 are a BBC radio session, broadcast on The Friday Rock Show on 1 August 1980. These tracks had not been available commercially before.
The album as such did not get a US release, but in 1982 Stiff Records released an album titled Hit and Run that was actually a compilation of Demolition and the band's second album, Hit and Run''. The track-listing for this US-only release was "Hit and Run"/ "Watch Your Step"/ "Race with the Devil"/ "Yeah Right"/ "Not for Sale"/ "Future Flash"/ "C'mon Let's Go"/ "The Hunter"/ "Kick It Down"/ "Take It All Away".

Personnel
Band members
 Kim McAuliffe – rhythm guitar, vocals on tracks 1, 5, 10
 Kelly Johnson – lead guitar, vocals on tracks 6, 15
 Enid Williams – bass, vocals on tracks 2, 3, 4, 7, 8, 9, 11, 12
 Denise Dufort – drums

Production
Vic Maile – producer, engineer, mixing

Release history

Charts

References

External links 
 Official Girlschool discography

Girlschool albums
1980 debut albums
Albums produced by Vic Maile
Bronze Records albums